Tazza is a 2008 South Korean television series starring Jang Hyuk, Han Ye-seul, Kim Min-jun, Kang Sung-yeon, Son Hyun-joo and Kim Kap-soo. It aired on SBS from September 16 to November 25, 2008 on Mondays and Tuesdays at 21:55 for 18 episodes.

The series is based on a manhwa of the same name by Huh Young-man and Kim Se-yeong, which was also made into the 2006 live-action film Tazza: The High Rollers.

Plot
Kind and warm-hearted, Goni (Jang Hyuk) only hopes for a better life for his single, hard-working mother (Park Soon-chun). He first starts gambling to make money to buy her a sewing machine, and even encourages her remarriage with local photographer Dae-ho (Lee Ki-young). What Goni doesn't know, however, is that his stepfather used to be Jirisan's notorious swindler and that Goni's best friend Young-min (Kim Min-jun) is actually plotting against Dae-ho. In the end, Dae-ho is killed because of Young-min, and Goni is framed. He lands in jail where he learns the ins and outs of gambling in the card game hwatu (lit. "war of flowers"). Upon Goni's release, he has only one goal: to gamble his way to the top and exact revenge on Young-min and his mastermind uncle Agwi (Kim Kap-soo).

Cast

Main characters
Jang Hyuk as Kim Goni
Yeo Jin-goo as young Goni
Han Ye-seul as Lee Nan-sook / Mi-na
Lee Han-na as young Nan-sook
Kim Min-jun as Young-min
Kang Sung-yeon as Madam Jeong
Son Hyun-joo as Go Kwang-ryeol
Kim Kap-soo as Agwi

Supporting characters
Im Hyun-sik as Pyeong Kyeong-jang
Lee Ki-young as Kang Dae-ho, Goni's stepfather
Park Soon-chun as Soon-im, Goni's mother
Im Ji-kyu as Sung-chan
Jang Won-young as Kye Dong-choon
Oh Jung-se as Kwang-tae, Nan-sook's brother
Kim Ji-young as Young-min's aunt
Lee So-jung as Pyeong Yoo-ra
Ahn Nae-sang as Myung-soo, Goni's father
Kwon Tae-won as Bool-gom ("Brown Bear")
Song Jong-ho as Ahn Se-hoon
Park Yong-soo as General Choi
Shin Seung-hwan as Goni's friend
Seo Dong-soo as Yong-pal
Jo Sang-gu as Jjakgwi
Baek Chan-ki as Chief priest Gam
Bang Kil-seung as Doksa ("Viper")
Kim Sung-hoon as Dong-choon's acting boss
Kim Yang-woo as swindler
Jeon Chang-gul as prison official

Awards
2008 SBS Drama Awards
 Excellence Award, Actor in a Special Planning Drama: Jang Hyuk
 Excellence Award, Actress in a Special Planning Drama: Han Ye-seul
 Excellence Award, Supporting Actor in a Special Planning Drama: Son Hyun-joo
 Best Young Actor: Yeo Jin-goo
 Top 10 Stars: Han Ye-seul

International broadcast
 It aired in Vietnam from August 5, 2009 on HTV3, under the title Canh bạc nghiệt ngã.

References

External links
 Tazza official SBS website 
 

2008 South Korean television series debuts
2008 South Korean television series endings
Seoul Broadcasting System television dramas
Television shows based on works by Huh Young-man
South Korean action television series
South Korean romance television series